

The DFW Dr.I was a prototype German fighter aircraft built during World War I.

Design and development
The DFW Dr.I prototype shared many design attributes with the D.I biplane, especially the Mercedes D.III piston engine. Therefore, the design of the D.I was used in building the Dr.I. It first flew in 1917, and in January 1918 was prepared for the fighter competition held at Adlershof in early 1918 along with the Euler Dr.II and Hansa-Brandenburg L.16. However, none of the entrants was chosen, and the Dr.I remained a prototype only.

Specifications

References

Bibliography

1910s German fighter aircraft
Dr.I
Single-engined tractor aircraft
Triplanes
Aircraft first flown in 1917